Amazing Love is the fifth album in the Worship series of praise & worship albums by Hillsong Church, which was released in April 2002. The album reached No. 25 on the Billboard Top Contemporary Christian Albums Chart.

Track listing

Personnel 

 Raymond Badham – arrangement
 Damian Bassett – backing vocals
 Julie Bassett – backing vocals
 Erica Crocker – backing vocals
 Mark Cullen – arrangement
 Tulele Faletolu – lead vocals
 Mitch Farmer – drums
 Michelle Fragar – lead vocals
 Giovanni Galanti – programming
 Craig Gower – piano and keyboards, programming
 Scott Haslem – backing vocals
 Nigel Hendroff – guitars, arrangement
 David Holmes – guitars
 Gary Honor – saxophone
 Bobbie Houston – executive producer
 Brian Houston – executive producer
 Peter King – piano and keyboards, programming
 Steve McPherson – lead vocals, backing vocals, arrangement, choral and vocal arrangement, co-producer
 Reuben Morgan – lead vocals, co-producer
 David Moyse – guitars, arrangement, programming
 Marty Sampson – lead vocals
 Peter Wallis – bass guitar
 Holly Watson – lead vocals
 Miriam Webster – lead vocals
 Darlene Zschech – lead vocals, backing vocals, arrangement, choral and vocal arrangement, producer
 "Amazing Love", Hillsong CD, Album cover slip

References

Hillsong Music albums
2002 albums